The Mixed Doubles Table tennis at the 2015 African Games was held from September 10–19, 2015 at several venues.

Draw

Finals

Top half

Section 1

Section 2

Section 3

Section 4

References

Table tennis at the 2015 African Games